Garðar Árnason (born 6 January 1938) is an Icelandic retired footballer who played as a defender for Knattspyrnufélag Reykjavíkur.

He earned 11 caps for Iceland, the first coming on 26 June 1959 in a 4–2 home loss to Denmark at Laugardalsvöllur in qualification for the 1960 Olympics. On 2 September 1962, his penultimate game, he scored his only goal to equalise in a 1–1 draw against the Republic of Ireland; the Irish advanced 5–2 on aggregate in the preliminary round of qualification for the 1964 European Nations' Cup.

References

1938 births
Living people
Gardar Arnason
Gardar Arnason
Gardar Arnason
Association football defenders